Stanley, the Ugly Duckling, a.k.a. Stanley, is an animated American television special that was produced by Fine Arts Films and aired on May 1, 1982 as part of ABC's Weekend Special lineup. It is loosely based on the 19th-century fairy tale The Ugly Duckling by Hans Christian Andersen.

Voices
 Susan Blu - Stanley
 Jack DeLeon - Nathan the fox
 Wolfman Jack - Eagle One
 Rick Dees - D.J.

Additional voices
 Brian Cummings
 Lee Thomas
 Julie McWhirter

Songs
 "Not a Duck" – Sung by Stanley
 "A Little Traveling Music Please" – Sung by Nathan and Stanley
 "Do Something Terrible Today" – Sung by Eagle One and the Hell's Eagles
 "I Like Myself" – Sung by Nathan and Stanley

Home video releases
Stanley was given its first American VHS release by Image Magnetic Associates in 1984. It was later re-released in 1992 by Family Home Entertainment, and more recently in 2005 by Lionsgate Home Entertainment.

References

External links
 
 

1982 television specials
1980s American television specials
ABC Weekend Special
1982 in American television
1980s animated television specials
Films about ducks
Animated films about foxes
Films based on The Ugly Duckling
Films directed by John David Wilson
Television shows based on works by Hans Christian Andersen